G4 is the debut studio album by English popera group G4, released in 2005. It debuted at the number one spot in the UK Albums Chart on the Mother's Day weekend selling 244,671 copies in the first week. It became the fastest-selling album of 2005. It has sold 611,000 copies as of December 2012.

The album features a cover of Queen's "Bohemian Rhapsody".

Track listing
All tracks produced by Graham Stack and Brian Rawling; except "Circle of Life" and "My Way" produced by Trevor Horn.
"Bohemian Rhapsody"
"Nessun dorma"
"Everybody Hurts"
"Circle of Life"
"Creep"
"To Where You Are"
"Life on Mars"
"The Flower Duet"
"Broken Vow"
"Jerusalem"
"You'll Never Walk Alone"
"My Way"

Charts

Weekly charts

Year-end charts

References

2005 debut albums
G4 (group) albums
Albums produced by Brian Rawling
Albums produced by Trevor Horn